Cow Bayou is a bayou in Orange County and Japser County in the U.S. state of Texas. It was formed by the Gum Slough and Dognash Gully. The bayou runs through the cities of Buna, Mauriceville Vidor, and Bridge City. There are 3 tributaries of the Cow Bayou, which includes Cole Creek, Terry Gully, and Coon Bayou.

History 
In the early 1910s, the bayou was formed by rice farmers. Since rice production skyrocketed over there, By 1911 almost all farmers in Orange County were using the bayou. In 1940 the Cow Bayou Swing Bridge was created, the bridge was the last major component constructed along Texas State Highway 87. The bridge is 806 feet long and has 2 lanes. In 1963 Congress improved the bayou by constructing a channel 100 feet wide and thirteen feet deep for 7.7 miles from its mouth to Orangefield. It wasn't till 1967 when the project came into effect since oil wells were blocking the construction plan. 

Fleash-eating bacteria was found in September 17, 2022, when a resident went into the water. This is the first case of flesh eating bacteria in Orange County. Officials have been warning residents about the flesh eating bacteria since the attack.

Wildlife 
Marine mammals:
West Indian manatee (very common)
Bottlenose dolphin (common))
Bull shark (common)
Hammerhead shark (very rarely)
Blacktip shark (common)
American alligator (very rare)

Smaller fish species:

Big fish species:

See also 
List of rivers in Texas

References 

Rivers of Texas
Drainage basins of the Gulf of Mexico
Borders of Texas
Rivers of Orange County, Texas
Rivers of Jasper County, Texas
Wetlands of Texas